Chinna was an Illyrian settlement located near the White Drin, near the modern-day settlement of Klina, Kosovo. It was settled by the ancient Dardani tribe.

See also 
List of ancient cities in Illyria

References 

Illyrian Kosovo
Former populated places in the Balkans
Cities in ancient Illyria